= Tony Linfjärd =

Swedish musician

Tony Linfjärd, born 1963 in Gothenburg, is a Swedish guitarist, composer and music producer. He has, as a composer on demand, mainly composed and produced music for large-scale companies such as IKEA and Volvo, but also for drama, i.e. the children's movie Flickan och dimman ('The Girl and the Mist'). In his own production company Blue Ball Music, Tony Linfjärd has released several music albums in his own name, and his music on demand has been awarded both nationally and internationally.

== Discography (in selection) ==
=== In his own name ===
- 2014 – Evergreen 2
- 2013 – Evergreen
- 2010 – In My Own Sweet Way
- 2001 – The Divine Comedy of Dante
- 1997 – Projects 1990–1996
- 1995 – Take Off
- 1990 – One

=== Production music for film ===
- 2006 – Jazz, Jazz, Jazz ...
- 1996 – Top Gear

== Sources ==
- Swedish Film Database
- IMDb
